Orkla ASA is a Norwegian conglomerate operating in the Nordic region, Eastern Europe, Asia and the US. At present, Orkla operates in the branded consumer goods, aluminium solutions and financial investment sectors. Orkla ASA is listed on the Oslo Stock Exchange and its head office is in Oslo, Norway. , Orkla had 21,423 employees. The Group's turnover in 2021 totalled NOK 50.4 billion.

Operations
Orkla's branded consumer goods division produces brands in many fields, primarily in the Nordic region, but also in other places such as Central and Eastern European countries, Russia and the Baltic region. Among the companies owned by Orkla are Abba Seafood, Beauvais foods, Chips, Felix Abba, Göteborgs Kex, Kalev, KiMs, Lilleborg, MTR Foods, Rasoi Magic, Peter Möller, Nidar, OLW, Panda, Procordia Food, Stabburet, Sætre, Pierre Robert Group and Laima.

As of February 2020 Orkla has major ownership in Jotun (42.6%). Borregaard was divested and listed on the Oslo Stock Exchange in 2012. Orkla's 50% interest of Sapa Group was sold in 2017.

History
Orkla started out in 1654 with pyrite mining at Løkken Verk in Sør-Trøndelag, Norway. Later the company also started mining copper, but copper mining was abandoned in 1845. In 1904 Orkla Grube-Aktiebolag was founded by Christian Thams to start commercial mining at Løkken Verk, which included the construction of Thamshavnbanen, the first electric railway in Norway, between Løkken Verk and Thamshavn. This railway is still operated as a museum railway after the mining operations at Løkken Verk were closed on 10 July 1987.

In 1929, Orkla became listed on Oslo Stock Exchange and in 1931 the new smelting plant at Thamshavn outside Orkanger is opened. By 1941 Orkla started with a separate investments portfolio, and opened offices in Oslo in 1975. In 1984 Orkla started a major takeover of Norwegian newspapers, creating Orkla Media as one of the three largest media companies in Norway. Half of the magazine publisher Egmont-Mortensen is added to Orkla Media in 1992 and the Danish Det Berlingske Officin in 2000. Orkla sold the media section to Mecom in 2006.

In 1986 Orkla merged with Borregaard based in Sarpsborg to form Orkla Borregaard. The company then merged with Nora Industrier in 1992. Borregaard was spun off and introduced to the Oslo Stock Exchange in October 2012, with Orkla retaining a minority stake in the company. Orkla heavily invested in foods and among others acquired Swedish brewery Pripps as well as other companies, including Abba Seafood, Baltic Beverages Holding and Procordia Food. Norwegian Ringnes and Pripps were merged with Carlsberg Breweries, where Orkla acquired a 40% ownership in 2000. Orkla sold its ownership in Carlsberg in 2004, the same year it bought SladCo.

In 2005 Orkla bought the Norwegian material company Elkem and Sapa Group in Sweden. In 2010 Orkla bought the Estonian confectionery company Kalev. It is known to be the fifth largest confectionery producer in Russia.

In November 2018 Orkla announced that it will acquire Finnish Kotipizza Group.

In March 2022, Orkla Health announced it had acquired 100% of the shares of dietary supplements supplier Healthspan Group Limited for £65 million on a cash and debt-free basis.

Brands

Orkla Foods

Abba Seafood – seafood (Sweden)
Ahti – herring
Bähncke – condiments
Banos – banana spread
Beauvais – condiments
Big One – frozen pizzas
Big One Diner – American food
Bjellands Fiskeboller – canned fish balls
Bob – juice, fruit preserves
Boy – herring
Den Gamle Fabrik – fruit preserves
Denja – salads, herrings
Ejderns – caviar
Ekstrom – desserts
Everest – bottled water (Latvia)
Felix – condiments, potatoes, vegetables
Frödinge – desserts
Fun Light – squash
Geisha – rice products
Gimsøy Baker'n – baking ingredients
Gimsøy Drinkmix – drink mix
Glyngøre – herring
Grandiosa – frozen pizzas
Grebbestads – anchovies
Gutta – juice (Latvia)
Gøy – squash
Hold-It – calzones
Hållö – shellfish
Idun – condiments
Jacky – yoghurts, puddings
JOKK – juice
K-salat – salads
Kalles Kaviar – caviar
Kikkoman – soy sauces
Kokkeklar – soups
Kung Gustaf – seafood
Latplanta – spices (Latvia)
Lierne – lefse
Limfjord – seafood
Liva Energi – energy drinks, protein drinks
Lucullus – herring
Løvstek – cube steak
Mors hjemmebakte flatbrød – flatbrød
Mr. Lee – instant noodles (Norway, Faroe Islands)
Mrs. Cheng's – Asian food
Nora – fruit preserves, canned vegetables, desserts, squash (Norway)
Nugatti – chocolate spreads (by Stabburet, Norway; also sold in Finland)
Nøtte – hazelnut butter
Pastella – pasta
Paulúns – natural food
Pizza Originale – frozen pizzas
Risifrutti – porridges
SaritaS – Indian food
Sjokade – chocolate spreads
Spilva – condiments, canned vegetables, juices, ready meals (Latvia)
Stabburet Leverpostei – leverpostej
Stabburet Pai – frozen pies
Stabburet Picnic – canned ham
Sunda – honey
SUSLAVICIUS – condiments, fruit preserves
Svennes – caviar
Tomtegløgg – mulled wine
Toro – soups, desserts, spices, powdered drink mixes (Rieber & Søn, Norway; also sold in Iceland)
Trondhjems – canned food
Truly Thai – Thai food
Vesta – herring
Vestlandslefsa – lefse
Vitana – bouilion powder, condiments (Czech Republic)
Vossafår – cold cuts
Önos – fruit preserves, squash

Orkla Confectionery & Snacks

Ādažu čipsi – potato chips (Latvia)
Ballerina – cookies
Bamsemums – chocolate
Bergene Melk – chocolate
Bixit – cookies
Bocca – chocolate
Café Bakeriet – cookies
Caramello – chocolate
Crispo – chocolate
Cuba – chocolate
Doc – throat lozenges
Extra – chewing gum (distribution only)
Fresh walk – sandwiches
Fun Light – juice 
Gjende – cookies
Göteborgs Kex – cookies
Gullbrød – marzipan
Hjemmelaget Julemarsipan – marzipan
Hobby – chocolate
Hubba Bubba – chewing gum (distribution only)
IFA – throat lozenges
Juicy Fruit – chewing gum (distribution only)
Julegris – marzipan pig
Julemarsipan – marzipan
Kalev – chocolates, biscuits, cookies, marzipans, caramels (Estonia)
KiMs – potato chips (Norway, Denmark)
Knott – candy
Kornmo – biscuits
Krembanan – chocolate
Kremtopper – chocolate
Krokantrøffel – chocolate
Laban – candy
Laima – chocolate (Latvia)
Laima sweets stores (Latvia)
Laima chocolate museum (Latvia)
Latfood – chips (Latvia)
Mokkabønner – chocolate
Mokkatrøffel – chocolate
Nero – chocolate, liquorice (by Nidar, Norway)
New Energy – chocolate
Nidar – chocolates, bulk candy (Norway)
 – potato chips
Old Town Bakery – confectionery, cakes (Latvia)
Panda – chocolate, liquorice candy (Finland)
Panda Liqueur – chocolate
Pauluns Wholemeal flakes, muesli, bars (Sweden)
Pedro – salty snacks (Latvia)
Polly – nuts (by KiMs Norge, Norway)
Safari – cookies
Sfinx – chocolate confections (by Nidar)
Skipper – liquorice candy
Smash! – chocolate (by Nidar, Norway)
Selga – cookies and waffles (Latvia)
Staburadze – confectionery and cakes (Latvia)
Smørbukk – caramel
Snøstenger – marzipan
Stratos – chocolate
Sætre – biscuits, cookies (Norway)
Troika – chocolate
Taffel The Original Snacks – salty snacks (Finland)

Orkla Care

Lilleborg

 Blenda – laundry products
 Comfort – fabric softeners
 Define – hair care products
 Dr. Greve – hygiene products
 Jif – cleaning products
 Jordan – dental hygiene products, cleaning supplies
 Klorin – chlorine products
 Krystal – cleaning products
 Lano – soap
 Lypsyl – moisturising lip balm (distribution only)
 Milo – laundry products
 Naturelle – soaps
 OMO – detergents
 Pepsodent – toothpaste (distribution only)
 Persil – laundry products
 Salmi – cleaning products
 Solidox – toothpaste
 Sterilan – deodorants
 Sun – dishwashing
 Svint – steel wool soap
 Zalo – dishwashing products

Orkla Health

Collett – vitamin supplements
CuraMed – throat lozenges
Gerimax – ginseng products
Gevita – vitamin supplements, mineral supplements, herbal remedies
Litozin – rosehip powder
Maxim – sports nutrition
Möllers Tran – Omega-3 products
Nutrilett – protein bars, dieting products
Pikasol – Omega-3 supplements
Sana-sol – vitamin supplements
Triomar – Omega-3 supplements
Vitaminbjørner – vitamin supplements
Vivag – intimate care products

Pierre Robert Group
La Mote – clothes
Pierre Robert – clothes

Orkla Food Ingredients

AMA – margarine
Bakkedal – butter
BaKo – baking equipment, cake decorations
Bæchs Conditori – baked goods
Candeco – cake decorations, ice cream decorations
Credin – baking products
Frima Vafler – ice cream cones
Jästbolaget – yeast
Kronjäst – yeast
KåKå – baking products
Mors Hjemmebakte – baking products
Naturli' – organic beverages
Nic – ice cream accessories
Odense – marzipan, nougat, chocolate
PureOil – cooking oil
Sonneveld – professional baking products

Other investments
Gränges – aluminium (listed on the Stockholm Stock Exchange)
Hydro Power – power plants
Sarp Falls – power plant
AS Saudefaldene (85%) – power plant
Jotun (42.53%) – paint manufacturer
Orkla Eiendom – real estate related to Orkla's own operations

References

External links

Orkla Annual Report 2017

Food and drink companies of Norway
Mining companies of Norway
 
Companies based in Oslo
Companies established in 1654
Holding companies of Norway
Companies listed on the Oslo Stock Exchange
1654 establishments in Norway
Multinational companies headquartered in Norway